Ross Atoll is a small atoll in the Admiralty Chart with an almost round lagoon. It is located at about five miles from the Northeast point of Ari Atoll.

The northern and western sides form one continuous barrier reef, and the eastern side is another barrier reef. The four mile wide lagoon has soundings from 15 to 20 fathoms (27 to 37 m) and abounds in detached coral patches.

This natural atoll was named Ross Atoll by Captain Robert Moresby during his survey of the Maldive Islands. It was named after Captain Daniel Ross of the Bombay Navy, one of the first surveyors of the area. Captain Ross later became the East India Company's Marine Surveyor General in Calcutta.

The main island is Rasdhoo. Kuramathi Tourist Resort is also located in this small atoll.

References
 Divehi Tārīkhah Au Alikameh. Divehi Bahāi Tārikhah Khidmaiykurā Qaumī Markazu. Reprint 1958 edn. Malé 1990.
 Divehiraajjege Jōgrafīge Vanavaru. Muhammadu Ibrahim Lutfee. G.Sōsanī.
 Xavier Romero-Frias, The Maldive Islanders, A Study of the Popular Culture of an Ancient Ocean Kingdom. Barcelona 1999.

Atolls of the Maldives